Richard Richardson (c. 1664 – 31 December 1714) was an English judge and Tory Member of Parliament.

He was the son of John Richardson of St. Bartholomew Exchange, London and Little Grove, East Barnet, Hertfordshire and educated in the law at the Middle Temple, where he was called to the bar in 1686. He became a Serjeant-at-law in 1705 and a judge of Sheriffs’ Courts, London by 1707, probably for life.

He was Member of Parliament (MP) for Dunwich from 1710 to 1713, and for Ipswich from 1 April 1714 until his death on 31 December 1714.

He married, in 1691, Sarah, probably the daughter of George Solme of Gillingham, Dorset and had 1 son and 1 daughter.

References

1664 births
1714 deaths
Lawyers from London
Members of the Middle Temple
Serjeants-at-law (England)
Members of the Parliament of Great Britain for Ipswich
British MPs 1710–1713
British MPs 1713–1715